La Revolución de Mayo (in Spanish, The May Revolution) is an Argentine silent movie made in 1909 and premiered in 1910. As the name denotes, it is focused on the events of the May Revolution, whose centennial took place by then. It was directed by Mario Gallo, and it was the first Argentine film made with professional actors.

References

External links
 Cine histórico, 25 de mayo de 1810 
 

1910 films
1910s historical films
Argentine historical films
Argentine silent films
Films set in the 1810s
Works about the Argentine War of Independence
Articles containing video clips
Argentine black-and-white films